Santa Maria Madalena may refer to:

Santa Maria Madalena, Rio de Janeiro, Brazil
Santa Maria Madalena, Madeira, Portugal

See also
Mary Magdalene, a saint
 Santa Maria Maddalena (disambiguation)